Derek Porter was a rower.

Derek Porter may also refer to:

Derek Porter (footballer) (born 1936), English footballer
Derek Porter, character in Meet the Browns (TV series)